Aillik Bay is a bay on the coast of Labrador in the province of Newfoundland and Labrador, Canada. The town of Aillik is located on the bay.

References

Bays of Newfoundland and Labrador